The Thailand Open in badminton is an open international championships held in Thailand since 1984. It was halted in 1986, 1998, 2002, 2010, 2014, and 2021.

BWF categorised Thailand Open as one of the seven BWF World Tour Super 500 events in the BWF events structure since 2018.

Past winners

Performances by nation

References

 
1984 establishments in Thailand
Badminton
Badminton
BWF World Tour
January sporting events
Recurring sporting events established in 1984
Badminton
Badminton
Badminton in Bangkok
Badminton tournaments in Thailand